Jeddah Economic City, previously known as Kingdom City, is a  project approved for construction in Jeddah, Saudi Arabia. The project is designed by the Kingdom Holding Company, a firm owned by Prince Al-Waleed bin Talal. Jeddah Economic City will host both commercial and residential development including homes, hotels, and offices.

The centerpiece of the development will be Jeddah Tower, planned to be the tallest building in the world upon its completion. The entire project is estimated to cost $20 billion (SR75 billion).

References

2016 establishments in Saudi Arabia
Economy of Jeddah
Geography of Jeddah
Proposed infrastructure in Saudi Arabia
Special economic zones
Planned cities in Saudi Arabia